Laurențiu Chițanu (born 1 September 2000) is a Moldovan footballer who plays as a striker for Spartak (Varna). Besides Moldova, he has played in Portugal, Italy, and Bulgaria.

Career

He started his career with Portuguese sixth tier side Marinhense B. Before the second half of 2019–20, he signed for Scandicci in the Italian fourth tier. In 2021, Chițanu signed for Moldovan club Florești, where he made 12 league appearances and scored 1 goal. On 8 August 2021, he debuted for Florești during a 1–4 loss to Milsami. On 6 November 2021, Chițanu scored his first goal for Florești during a 1–5 loss to Dinamo-Auto. Before the second half of 2021–22, he signed for Spartak (Varna) in Bulgaria after trialing for Spanish team Castellón.

References

External links
 

2000 births
Association football forwards
Expatriate footballers in Bulgaria
Expatriate footballers in Italy
Expatriate footballers in Portugal
FC Florești players
FC Spartak Varna players
Living people
Moldovan expatriate footballers
Moldovan expatriate sportspeople in Bulgaria
Moldovan expatriate sportspeople in Italy
Moldovan expatriate sportspeople in Portugal
Moldovan footballers
Moldovan Super Liga players
Scandicci Calcio players
Footballers from Chișinău